Sérgio Ricardo dos Santos Vieira, shortly Sergio (born 28 Man 1975) is a Brazilian footballer, who played as a forward.

Club career
He played many clubas in Belgium and Portugal and he played for FC Seoul in K League 2003

References

External links
 Prophile at BRASOCCER
 

1975 births
Living people
Brazilian footballers
Brazilian expatriate footballers
K League 1 players
FC Seoul players
Expatriate footballers in South Korea
Brazilian expatriate sportspeople in South Korea
Association football forwards